Urodoidea is a superfamily of moths in the clade Apoditrysia. It currently contains two families: Urodidae and Ustyurtiidae.

References 

Lepidoptera superfamilies
Ditrysia